The history of high-rises in the United States city of Dayton, Ohio, began in 1896 with the construction of the Reibold Building. Although the Reibold Building was Dayton's first high-rise, the Centre City Building is often regarded as the first "skyscraper" in the city and was completed in 1924.
The original portion of the building opened in 1904, when the tower portion was completed two decades later, it was one of the tallest reinforced concrete buildings in the world, and the tallest in the United States. Dayton went through an early building boom in the late 1920s, during which several high-rise buildings, including the Key Bank Building, were constructed. The city experienced a second, much larger building boom that lasted from the early 1970s to late 1980s. During this time, Dayton saw the construction of six skyscrapers, including the Stratacache Tower, also known as the Kettering Tower, and KeyBank Tower.

Stratacache Tower was formally Kettering Tower (named for Virginia Kettering), and was originally Winters Tower, the headquarters of Winters Bank, and the building was renamed when Winters merged with Bank One. KeyBank Tower was formerly known as the MeadWestvaco Tower before KeyBank gained naming rights to the building in 2008. Dayton is the site of five skyscrapers that rise at least  in height. The most recently completed high-rise in the city is the Miami Valley Hospital Southeast Tower, which was constructed in 2010 and rises .

Tallest completed buildings 
This includes spires and architectural details but does not include antenna masts. An equal sign (=) following a rank indicates the same height between two or more buildings. The "Year" column indicates the year in which a building was completed.

Timeline of tallest buildings
This lists buildings that once held the title of tallest building in Dayton.

References
General

Specific

External links

Diagram of Dayton skyscrapers on SkyscraperPage

Dayton
 
Tallest buildings
Tallest in Dayton